A Show of Hands is a series of short films created by puppeteer Tim Lagasse for Nickelodeon. It was a predecessor to the television program Oobi. Each film is about one minute long and follows personified hands as they perform a small skit or a visual illusion. The series started airing on Nickelodeon as an interstitial program in 1992, and reruns were shown through 1997. The title is a reference to the phrase "show of hands," used literally to refer to a television show about hands.

Lagasse wrote, directed, and performed A Show of Hands at the University of Connecticut while earning his BFA in Puppet Arts. The series was shot in black and white, with the exception of the vanity card that appears at the end of each film. After the conclusion of the series, Lagasse went to work as a director and performer on Nickelodeon's Oobi, which features similar bare hand puppets as characters. His work on A Show of Hands was what led to him being cast on Oobi.

The films were positively received and won awards from UNIMA and Broadcast Design International. In 2001, Lagasse began performing an extended live version of the Show of Hands skits at the HERE Arts Center in New York.

Format
The films follow a similar format and include recurring elements. Each film opens with seven white-gloved hands forming a cartoonish face that announces, "And now, Nickelodeon presents A Show of Hands." The hands disperse and present the main part of the short. It involves individual hands silently acting out skits. Once the short finishes, an audience of hands gives a big round of applause. The films close with a shot of the Nickelodeon logo on a hand painted orange.

History
The films were produced and shot at the University of Connecticut. They were made in 1991. The series' opening sequence was filmed entirely under blacklight; the performers wore blacklight-reactive white gloves and dark clothing to create the illusion of hands floating through space. In the shorts proper, the background was also entirely black, but the puppeteers' hands were bare and certain set pieces were made visible through the use of followspots on particular stage areas. According to Lagasse, the films were "based on earlier work."

In 1992, The New York Times reported that MTV had expressed interest in airing the series. MTV's parent company, Viacom, acquired the films but aired them on its children's network Nickelodeon instead. A Nickelodeon vanity card (shot in color, unlike the rest of the segments) was created for the films after Nick acquired them. They premiered as an interstitial program in 1992, and reruns were shown through 1997. They were also aired internationally, including on the Australian branch of Nickelodeon in 2000.

On November 16, 2001, Lagasse debuted an extended live version of A Show of Hands at the HERE Arts Center in New York City. Unlike in the television version, Lagasse was the sole performer and did not use gloves. Each performance lasted one hour and incorporated a blend of new material and techniques from the original films.

Cast
Tim Lagasse - lead performer
Jim Napolitano - ensemble puppeteer

Episodes

Awards

See also
History of Nickelodeon

Notes

References

1990s American children's television series
1990s Nickelodeon original programming
1992 American television series debuts
American television shows featuring puppetry
English-language television shows
Short film series